Un Jini is a village in the Sendurai taluk of Ariyalur district, Tamil Nadu, India. A powerful temple is located in this village near the pond.

Demographics 

As per the 2001 census, Unjini had a total population of 4637 with 2301 males and 2336 females.
Unjini village has a very famous temple named "Semmalaiyappan swamy". This temple home of around 100 families in Salem district like Thammampatty, Attur, Thandanur and Tanjore district, Kumbakonam near Neelathanallur village is having more than 40 families.

Semmalaiyappan Swamy
This temple was constructed by King Veerapparathabar in "Saka" (in Tamil year) 1375.
In 1453, King Visabathaka Mallika Arjunarraiy got authority to maintain the temple.
In Karthikai (Tamil Month) 15th, the Authentication is given to Panjasavaraya by Vilvarayar.
The temple swamies are Aiyam Perumal, Seprumal Pavayi, Aiyanar, Perumal, semmalai, karupusami.

It is a very pleasant place to stay in the overall culture and style.

Most of the places are good cultivated lands around the villages and one of the most dangerous thing is much of the land is occupied by the cement industry.

Always the legend of history 
Unjini "All community groups are same" groups

References 

Villages in Ariyalur district